Fujioka Dam  is a rockfill dam located in Hyogo Prefecture in Japan. The dam is used for irrigation. The catchment area of the dam is 1.9 km2. The dam impounds about 8  ha of land when full and can store 870 thousand cubic meters of water. The construction of the dam was started on 1972 and completed in 1983.

See also
List of dams in Japan

References

Dams in Hyogo Prefecture